Stamatis Vellidis (Kornofolia, Soufli, Evros, 1928 – 2 November 2021) was a general of the Hellenic Army who acted as chief of the Hellenic Army General Staff (1986–1989) and chief of the Hellenic National Defence General Staff (1989–1990). After his retirement, he became president of the Administrative Council of the Hellenic Arms Industry. He was a close friend and associate of the Minister for National Defence Ioannis Charalambopoulos.

Biography 
He was born in 1928 in the village of Kornofolia of the Evros prefecture, near Soufli. He studied in the Hellenic Military Academy, graduating on 12 August 1952 as a second lieutenant of Engineers. As an officer he also studied in the Engineers School, the Superior War School and the National Defence School, as well as in the  Technical Engineers Officer School and the National Technical University of Athens (Faculty of Civil Engineers).

He served as commander and staff officer in various units and formations, notably as commander of the Engineers for the 9th Infantry Division and the IV Army Corps, commanding officer of the 11th Infantry Division and of the III Army Corps, and head of the Engineers Directorate and IV Branch of the  Hellenic Army General Staff. Promoted to lieutenant general in 1984, he served as Inspector-General of the Army, and from 23 December 1986, as Chief of the HAGS. During his term  as chief of the HAGS, he mobilised the army during the 1987 Aegean crisis with Turkey. On 2 January 1989 he was named Chief of the Hellenic National Defence General Staff and promoted to full general. He held the post until his retirement in May 1990.

In 1993 he was a candidate for parliament with PASOK, but was not elected. He then acted as president of the board of directors of the Hellenic Arms Industry from 1993 to 1997.

Vellidis died on 2 November 2021, at the age of 93.

Dates of rank 
 Second lieutenant: 1952 
 Lieutenant: 1954 
 Captain: 1960 
 Major: 1967 
 Lieutenant colonel: 1973 
 Colonel: 1979 
 Brigadier: 1981 
 Major general: 1983 
 Lieutenant general: 1984 
 General: 1989

References 

1928 births
2021 deaths
Chiefs of the Hellenic National Defence General Staff
Chiefs of the Hellenic Army General Staff
Hellenic Army generals
People from Evros (regional unit)
National Technical University of Athens alumni